Amin Mimoun Nouri (born 10 January 1990) is a Norwegian professional footballer who currently plays for HamKam . He can play as a full back or as a midfielder.

On 16 July 2011 he was traded to Start from Vålerenga.

Nouri has represented Norway internationally at various youth levels. He hasn't played for Norway at senior level and remains eligible to play for the country of his parents, Morocco.

Career statistics

References

External links
 
 

1990 births
Living people
Footballers from Oslo
Association football defenders
Norwegian footballers
Norway under-21 international footballers
Norway youth international footballers
Norwegian people of Moroccan descent
SK Brann players
Vålerenga Fotball players
Nybergsund IL players
IK Start players
Hamarkameratene players
K.V. Oostende players
Eliteserien players
Norwegian First Division players
Norwegian Second Division players
Norwegian Third Division players
Belgian Pro League players
Norwegian expatriate footballers
Expatriate footballers in Belgium